Marc S. Wold is an American biochemist currently at University of Iowa and an Elected Fellow of the American Association for the Advancement of Science. His research interests are eukaryotic cells and DNA and his high citations for this field is 1254, 547 and 471.

References

Year of birth missing (living people)
Living people
Fellows of the American Association for the Advancement of Science
University of Iowa faculty
American biochemists
California Institute of Technology alumni
Johns Hopkins University alumni